This is a list of earthquakes in 1903. Only magnitude 6.0 or greater earthquakes appear on the list. Exceptions to this are earthquakes which have caused death, injury or damage. Events which occurred in remote areas will be excluded from the list as they wouldn't have generated significant media interest. All dates are listed according to UTC time. The countries and their flags are noted as they would have appeared in this year for example the Dutch East Indies being present-day Indonesia. A quieter year than normal but one with many deaths. The bulk of the deaths in this year came from a quake which struck Turkey in April. The largest event of the year was a magnitude 8.1 earthquake in Greece but this only caused two deaths.

Overall

By death toll 

 Note: At least 10 casualties

By magnitude 

 Note: At least 7.0 magnitude

Notable events

January

February

March

April

May

June

August

September

October

November

December

References 

1903
 
1903